Martti Peltoniemi (16 June 1935 – 2 August 1975) was a Finnish wrestler. He competed in the men's freestyle lightweight at the 1960 Summer Olympics.

References

External links
 

1935 births
1975 deaths
Finnish male sport wrestlers
Olympic wrestlers of Finland
Wrestlers at the 1960 Summer Olympics
People from Lappajärvi
Sportspeople from South Ostrobothnia